The 1993 NCAA Division I women's volleyball tournament began with 48 teams and ended on December 18, 1993, when Long Beach State defeated Penn State 3 games to 1 in the NCAA championship match.

Long Beach State won the program's second NCAA title. Led by Nichelle Burton's 28 kills and AVCA National Player of the Year Danielle Scott's 21 kills, the 49ers defeated Penn State 15–13, 12–15, 15–11, 16–14.

The NCAA's expansion of 32 tournament teams to 48 tournament teams began in 1993.

Records

Brackets

West regional

Mideast regional

Northwest regional

South regional

Final Four - UW Field House, Madison, Wisconsin

See also
NCAA Women's Volleyball Championship

References

NCAA Women's Volleyball Championship
NCAA
Volleyball in Wisconsin
December 1993 sports events in the United States
1993 in sports in Wisconsin
Sports competitions in Wisconsin